The 1985 Florida Federal Open was a women's tennis tournament played on outdoor hard courts at the Bardmoor Country Club in Largo, Florida in the United States and was part of the 1985 Virginia Slims World Championship Series. It was the 13th edition of the tournament and was held from November 4 through November 10, 1985. Eighth-seeded Stephanie Rehe won the singles title and earned $27,000 first-prize money.

Finals

Singles
 Stephanie Rehe defeated  Gabriela Sabatini 6–4, 6–7(4–7), 7–5
 It was Rehe's 2nd singles title of the year and of her career.

Doubles
 Carling Bassett /  Gabriela Sabatini defeated  Lisa Bonder /  Laura Gildemeister 6–0, 6–0

References

External links
 ITF tournament edition details

Eckerd Open
Federal Open
Florida Federal Open
20th century in Tampa, Florida
Sports competitions in Tampa, Florida
Florida Federal Open
Florida Federal Open